Pardhi is a Bhil language, or more likely languages, of India. Dialects are Neelishikari, Pittala Bhasha, Takari, Haran Shikari.

References

Languages of India
Bhil